Nindu Manishi is an Indian Telugu-language action film directed by S. D. Lal, starring Sobhan Babu, Jayachithra, Kaikala Satyanarayana and Deepa. It is a remake of the Bollywood film Samaadhi. The film was released on 26 January 1978 coinciding with Republic Day.

Cast
Shoban Babu
Jayachithra
Kaikala Satyanarayana
Deepa

Soundtrack

Reception 
The film was a critical and commercial failure.

References

External links 

1978 films
1970s Telugu-language films
Films scored by Satyam (composer)
Telugu remakes of Hindi films
Films directed by S. D. Lal